Julian Knight could refer to:

 Julian Knight (murderer) (born 1968), an Australian murderer
 Julian Knight (executive), former chairman and CEO of climate change campaign Global Cool
 Julian Knight (politician) (born 1972), a British Conservative politician